18th Regiment or 18th Infantry Regiment may refer to:

 18th Infantry Regiment (Imperial Japanese Army)  
 18th Alpini Regiment, a unit of the Italian Army
 18 (UKSF) Signal Regiment, a unit of the British Army
 18th Royal Hussars, a unit of the British Army
 18th Infantry (British Indian Army), a unit of the British Indian Army
 18th Infantry Regiment (United States), a unit of the United States Army
 18th Marine Regiment (United States), a unit of the United States Marine Corps 
 Royal Irish Regiment (1684–1922) was formerly the 18th Regiment of Foot

 American Civil War regiments 

 Confederate (Southern) Army regiments
 18th Regiment Alabama Infantry
 18th Arkansas Infantry Regiment (Carroll's)
 18th Arkansas Infantry Regiment (Marmaduke's)
 18th Georgia Volunteer Infantry
 18th North Carolina Infantry
 18th Virginia Cavalry
 18th Virginia Infantry

 Union (Northern) Army regiments
 18th U.S. Colored Infantry
 18th Connecticut Infantry Regiment
 18th Illinois Volunteer Infantry Regiment
 18th Iowa Volunteer Infantry Regiment
 18th Regiment Indiana Infantry
 18th Regiment Massachusetts Volunteer Infantry 
 18th Michigan Volunteer Infantry Regiment
 18th Missouri Volunteer Infantry
 18th New Hampshire Volunteer Infantry
 18th New York Volunteer Infantry
 18th Kansas Militia Infantry Regiment
 18th Regiment Kentucky Volunteer Infantry
 18th Ohio Infantry
 18th Vermont Volunteer Infantry Regiment
 18th Wisconsin Volunteer Infantry Regiment

See also
 XVIII Corps (disambiguation)
 18th Division (disambiguation)
 18th Brigade (disambiguation)
 18th Battalion (disambiguation)
 18 Squadron (disambiguation)